Carex lurida is a monocot species of the family Cyperaceae, also known as the sedge family. The common name for Carex lurida is shallow sedge. Carex lurida is an obligate wetland plant.

References

Flora of North America
lurida